The Chief of the General Staff of the Armed Forces of the Republic of Tajikistan is the highest-ranking military officer of in the Armed Forces of the Republic of Tajikistan, who is responsible for maintaining the operational command of the military and its three major branches.

Functions
The chief maintains the following functions in his/her position:

 To maintain the combat readiness of the armed forces
 To carry out military decisions made by the President and Prime Minister
 To identify threats to the country 
 To develop the strength and capability of the military 
 To engage in military cooperation

List of Chiefs

See also
 Armed Forces of the Republic of Tajikistan
 Ministry of Defence (Tajikistan)
 National Guard (Tajikistan)

References

Tajikistan